Amaranthus hypochondriacus is an ornamental plant commonly known as Prince-of-Wales feather or prince's-feather. Originally endemic to Mexico, it is called quelite, bledo and quintonil in Spanish.

In Africa and El Salvador, like many other species in the family Amaranthaceae, it is valued as source of food. The leaves and seeds are very nutritious and have a mild flavor. The seeds also contain phenolic compounds.

In temperate regions, it is cultivated as a half-hardy annual. Numerous cultivars have been selected, of which 'Green Thumb' and 'Pygmy Torch'  have gained the Royal Horticultural Society's Award of Garden Merit. It grows best in well-drained soils in full sun, and is suitable for USDA hardiness zones 3–10. It may be susceptible to aphids.

It is often grown for its flowers, which appear in dense, catkin-like inflorescences in the summer and autumn. They are usually deep purplish-red, but may be yellow-green. The leaves are simple and alternately arranged, with entire margins.

References

External links

 Carl von Linnés digitala växtbibliotek
 PROTAbase on Amaranthus hypochondriacus
 

hypochondriacus
Annual plants
Crops originating from Mexico
Flora of Mexico
Garden plants
Plants described in 1753
Taxa named by Carl Linnaeus